3030 may refer to:

In general
 A.D. 3030, a year in the 4th millennium CE
 3030 BC, a year in the 4th millennium BCE
 3030, a number in the 3000 (number) range

Other uses
 .30-30 ammunition
 3030 Press, an independent Hong Kong publishing company
 Winchester drive IBM model 3030 computer equipment
 , a World War II German U-boat
 Texas Farm to Market Road 3030
 3030 Vehrenberg, an asteroid in the Asteroid Belt, the 3030th asteroid registered

See also

 
 30-30 (disambiguation)
 30 (disambiguation)